Glebionis coronaria, formerly called Chrysanthemum coronarium, is a species of flowering plant in the  daisy family. It is native to the Mediterranean region. It is cultivated and naturalized in East Asia and in scattered locations in North America.

Glebionis coronaria is used as a leaf vegetable. English language common names include garland chrysanthemum, chrysanthemum greens, edible chrysanthemum, crowndaisy chrysanthemum, chop suey greens, crown daisy, and Japanese greens.

Glebionis coronaria has been hybridized with related Argyranthemum species to create cultivars of garden marguerites.

Characteristics 
A leafy herb, the garland chrysanthemum is an annual plant. It has yellow ray florets grouped in small flower heads and aromatic, bipinnately lobed leaves. Its seeds are ribbed and winged cypselae. The vegetable grows very well in mild or slightly cold climates, but will go quickly into premature flowering in warm summer conditions. Seeds are sown in early spring and fall.

"The plant is rich in minerals and vitamins with potassium concentrations at 610 mg/100 g and carotene at 3.4 g/100 g in edible portions. In addition, the plant contains various antioxidants (in stem, leaf, and root tissues) that have potential long-term benefits for human health, although toxic (dioxin) properties have also been observed. Extracts from C. coronarium var. spatiosum have been shown to inhibit growth of Lactobacillus casei, a beneficial human intestinal bacterium."

Culinary uses 

The plant's greens are used in many Asian cuisines. It is widely available in China where it is called 茼蒿(菜) (Cantonese tong ho (choy), Mandarin tónghāo (cài)) and appears in multiple Chinese cuisines as an ingredient for stir-fries, stews, casseroles, and hotpots. In Japanese cuisine, it is called "spring chrysanthemum", and is used in nabemono, mixed into rice, or drizzled with soy sauce and sesame seeds as a side dish. Korean cuisine use the greens in soups, stews, and alone as a side dish (banchan). In a hotpot, it is added at the last moment to the pot to avoid overcooking.

In Crete, a variety of the species called mantilida (μαντηλίδα) has its tender shoots eaten raw or steamed by the locals (see Greek cuisine).

Gallery

References

External links 
 

Asian vegetables
Flora of Asia
Flora of Europe
Plants described in 1753
Taxa named by Carl Linnaeus
Leaf vegetables
Cantonese cuisine
Hong Kong cuisine
Glebionidinae